Yeshivat Har Hamor; is a Religious Zionist yeshiva in Har Homa, Jerusalem, founded in 1997 as an offshoot of Yeshivat Mercaz HaRav. The president of the yeshiva is Rabbi Zvi Thau, and its other heads are Rabbis Amiel Sternberg and Mordechai Sternberg. There are currently around 450 students. Many of the students are married ("avrechim"), and the average student age is higher than at most Religious Zionist yeshivas.

The name means "mountain of myrrh", based on Song of Songs 4:6, a phrase which in the Jewish tradition refers to the Temple Mount. The word "Hamor" is also an acronym for "Hemshech [= continuation of] Mercaz HaRav".

History

The Yeshiva was founded when a group of rabbis, led by Rabbi Zvi Thau, broke off from Mercaz Harav. The broader cause of the separation was a disagreement between Rabbi Avraham Shapira, head of Mercaz HaRav, and Rabbi Thau about the best approach for Torah education. The immediate cause was Rabbi Thau's opposition to the establishment of a teacher's college in the yeshiva, which in his opinion would damage the purity of the yeshiva's approach to Torah study. Much tension existed between the camps at the time, but it has declined with time. This was the first time a Religious Zionist Yeshiva has split.

The yeshiva has been located at sites in several neighbourhoods in Jerusalem - Kiryat Menachem, then Bayit VeGan, and then, in 2008, to Kiryat HaYovel. The yeshiva moved to a newly built permanent building in the Har Homa neighbourhood in August 2017.

Ideology

The yeshiva follows the teachings of Rabbi Abraham Isaac Kook and his son Rabbi Tzvi Yehuda Kook. It has a mamlachti ("statist") approach which sees special holiness in the institution of the State of Israel, which Rabbi Kook (the elder) termed "God's throne in the world". The yeshiva stands at the head of a number of institutions also connected to Rabbi Thau, which together are known as "Yeshivot hakav" ("yeshivas that follow the line").

In addition to the study of Talmud with the traditional commentators (Rishonim and Achronim), the Yeshiva puts an emphasis on the study of Jewish thought (Machshava) according to the approach of Rabbi Kook.

Students usually serve in the Israeli army in a framework called "Hesder Mercaz", as in Yeshivat Mercaz HaRav.

References

External links

 Official website of Har Hamor
 Facebook page of American Friends of Yeshivat Har Hamor'

Orthodox yeshivas in Jerusalem
Religious Zionist yeshivot
Chardal
Educational institutions established in 1997
Yeshivot hesder
1997 establishments in Israel